Torreta de Guardamar  or Torre de los Americanos is a 380-metre tall guyed radio mast erected by the US Navy near Guardamar del Segura, Spain. It was built in 1962 and is the tallest architectural structure in both the Iberian peninsula and the European Union, and the tallest military structure in Europe. Its base is situated 64 metres above sea level at a distance of 1.4 km from the sea.

Details
Torreta de Guardamar is a mast radiator insulated from earth, and is used to transmit orders to submerged submarines. It is made as a lattice structure with triangular cross section. In spite of its enormous height, it is low in relation to the wavelength of the waves it transmits. Its capacity is augmented by multiple cables connected to its top and running to anchors around the mast. These cables are electrically connected to the mast and are divided at a certain distance by insulators.

The transmitter using Torreta de Guardamar as antenna had been, since its inauguration, remotely controlled by the US Naval Communication Station in Rota. Then it was transferred to the Spanish Navy, and is used for transmitting orders to submerged submarines stationed in Cartagena during their operations. As opposed to other VLF transmitters such as the DHO38 in Rhauderfehn, it has no fixed frequency allocation by ITU and carries no callsign.

This installation is currently guarded by Spanish Marine Infantry, and is marked as "Radio Estación Naval - Antena LF 380 metros - Guardamar", with the facilities being listed officially as "Estación Radio de Guardamar del Segura".

Notes

References

External links 
 

Towers in Spain
Radio masts and towers in Europe
Towers completed in 1962